Quipapá is a city located in the state of Pernambuco, Brazil. Located  at 186 km away from Recife, capital of the state of Pernambuco. Has an estimated (IBGE 2020) population of 26,175 inhabitants.

Geography
 State - Pernambuco
 Region - Zona da mata Pernambucana
 Boundaries - Panelas   (N);  Alagoas  state   (S);  São Benedito do Sul  (E); Canhotinho and Jurema   (W)
 Area - 230.61 km2
 Elevation - 462 m
 Hydrography - Una and Mundaú rivers
 Vegetation - Subperenifólia forest
 Clima - Hot tropical and humid
 Annual average temperature - 22.9 c
 Distance to Recife - 186 km

Economy
The main economic activities in Quipapá are based in agribusiness, especially sugarcane, bananas, manioc; and livestock such as cattle, sheep and poultry.

Economic indicators

Economy by Sector
2006

Health indicators

References

Municipalities in Pernambuco